Shibpur Union is an Union parishad of Chitalmari Upazila, Bagerhat District in Khulna Division of Bangladesh. It has an area of 37.30 km2 (14.40 sq mi) and a population of 25,336.

References

Unions of Chitalmari Upazila
Unions of Bagerhat District
Unions of Khulna Division